Eglė Balčiūnaitė (born October 31, 1988 in Šiauliai) is a track and field middle distance runner who competes internationally for Lithuania.

She competed in the 2008 Olympics in 800 m distance and finished 22nd. She took part in the 2009 European Athletics U23 Championships in Kaunas and placed 6th in the final. She participated in the 2010 IAAF World Indoor Championships where she achieved her personal best and finished 5th in the indoor 800 m discipline.

In January 2023 Balčiūnaitė announced about her retirement from professional sport.

Personal records 
800 m – 1:59.29  s (2010, outdoor, Monaco Diamond League)
800 m – 2:01.23 s (2011, indoor, Germany, national record)
400 m – 53.47 s (2010, indoor, Portugal, national record)

References

1988 births
Living people
Lithuanian female middle-distance runners
Olympic athletes of Lithuania
Athletes (track and field) at the 2008 Summer Olympics
Athletes (track and field) at the 2016 Summer Olympics
Universiade medalists in athletics (track and field)
Balciunaite
Universiade bronze medalists for Lithuania
European Games competitors for Lithuania
Athletes (track and field) at the 2019 European Games
Medalists at the 2013 Summer Universiade